2015 Vegalta Sendai season.

J1 League

Honours

Indivitual 

 Monthly Best Goal
  Ryang Yong-gi

 Meritorious Player Award
  Atsushi Yanagisawa

References

External links
 J.League official site

Vegalta Sendai
Vegalta Sendai seasons